The 2019 Hockey East Men's Ice Hockey Tournament was played between March 15 and March 23, 2019, at campus locations and at the TD Garden in Boston, Massachusetts. Northeastern won their 3rd tournament and earned Hockey East's automatic bid into the 2019 NCAA Division I Men's Ice Hockey Tournament.

The tournament was the 35th in league history.

Format
In a departure from the format of the last few years, just eight of the 11 teams will qualify for the 2019 Hockey East tournament. The top four teams in the league standings will host seeds five through eight on campus in the quarterfinals in the first round of the playoffs, while the remaining teams will be eliminated from championship contention.

The four quarterfinal winners will be reseeded again as they advance to the TD Garden in Boston for the semifinals and Championship Game.

Standings

Bracket
Teams are reseeded for the Semifinals

Note: * denotes overtime period(s)

Results

Quarterfinals

(1) Massachusetts vs. (8) New Hampshire

Game 1, March 15

Game 2, March 16

(2) Providence vs. (7) Boston College

Game 1, March 15

Game 2, March 16

Game 3, March 17

(3) Northeastern vs. (6) Maine

Game 1, March 15

Game 2, March 16

(4) Massachusetts–Lowell vs. (5) Boston University

Game 1, March 15

Game 2, March 16

Game 3, March 17

Semifinals

(1) Massachusetts vs (7) Boston College

(3) Northeastern vs. (5) Boston University

Championship

(3) Northeastern vs. (7) Boston College

Tournament awards

All-Tournament Team
G Cayden Primeau* (Northeastern)
D Jeremy Davies (Northeastern)
D Ryan Shea (Northeastern)
F Brandon Hawkins (Northeastern)
F Zach Solow (Northeastern)
F David Cotton (Boston College)
* Tournament MVP(s)

References

External links
2019 Hockey East Men's Ice Hockey Tournament

Hockey East Men's Ice Hockey Tournament
Hockey East Men's Ice Hockey Tournament
Hockey East Men's Ice Hockey Tournament
Hockey East Men's Ice Hockey Tournament
Ice hockey competitions in Boston
College sports tournaments in Massachusetts